WKEN is a radio station licensed to Kenton, Ohio broadcasting on 88.5 FM. WKEN airs a Christian contemporary music format and is owned by Soaring Eagle Promotions, Inc. The station operates in a simulcast with sister station WSOH.

On December 17, 2021, the station was rebranded as "Rise FM".

References

External links
WKEN's website

Contemporary Christian radio stations in the United States
KEN